Mackenheim is a French commune located in the department of Bas-Rhin and, since 1 January 2021, in the Grand Est region within the territory of the European Community of Alsace.

This commune is located in the historical and cultural region of Alsace.

Geography
Situated halfway between Strasbourg and Mulhouse, 2 km from the Rhine, this Ried village in central Alsace has a population of nearly 750. The village is part of the canton of Marckolsheim and the district of Sélestat-Erstein.

Two landscapes characterise its territory: agricultural areas dominated by maize cultivation and the Rhine forest recognised as a remarkable natural area. Several large buildings, mostly built in the 19th century (the church, the former synagogue, the town hall-school, the presbytery, the forest house, etc.) give the village a special character. Today, the preservation of the old built heritage is combined with the creation of new residential areas.

See also
 Communes of the Bas-Rhin department

References

Communes of Bas-Rhin
Bas-Rhin communes articles needing translation from French Wikipedia
Historic Jewish communities